Richard Eldridge Maltby Jr. (born October 6, 1937) is an American theatre director and producer, lyricist, and screenwriter. He conceived and directed the only two musical revues to win the Tony Award for Best Musical: Ain't Misbehavin' (1978: Tony, N.Y. Drama Critics, Outer Critics, Drama Desk Awards, also Tony Award for Best Director) and Fosse (1999: Tony, Outer Critics, Drama Desk Awards).

Life and career
Maltby was born in Ripon, Wisconsin, the son of Virginia (née Hosegood) and Richard Maltby, Sr., a well-known orchestra leader. 
 
Maltby and David Shire started working together as students at Yale University (where he was a member of Manuscript Society); their first Broadway credit was in 1968, when their song "The Girl of the Minute" was used in the revue New Faces of 1968. In 1977 the Manhattan Theatre Club produced a revue of their earlier songs, written for other works, finally titled Starting Here, Starting Now. With composer Shire, Maltby was the director and lyricist for Baby, (1983, book by Sybille Pearson) and the lyricist for Big (1996, book by John Weidman). Also with Shire, he conceived and wrote the lyrics for Take Flight (book by John Weidman), which had its world premiere in July 2007 at the Menier Chocolate Factory in London.

He was director/co-lyricist for the American version of Andrew Lloyd Webber's Song and Dance, (1986) starring Bernadette Peters. He was co-lyricist for Miss Saigon (Evening Standard Award 1990; Tony nomination: Best Score, 1991).

He also conceived and directed Ring of Fire, a musical about Johnny Cash, which ran on Broadway in 2006. He is co-bookwriter/lyricist for The Pirate Queen (2007). He was most recently represented on Broadway as the director of the new, original musical The Story of My Life by composer/lyricist Neil Bartram and book writer Brian Hill. That musical had a brief run at the Booth Theatre in February 2009. and received a 2009 Drama Desk Award nomination for outstanding production of a musical.

Since 1976 he has constructed the monthly cryptic crossword puzzles for Harper's Magazine, formerly in collaboration with E. R. Galli.  He constructed cryptic crosswords for New York Magazine in the early 1970s.

Personal life

Maltby married twice: first to Barbara Black Sudler on June 5, 1965 (they had two children, Nicholas and David), and second, in 1987, to Janet Brenner (they had three children, Jordan, Emily, and Charlotte).
He now has seven grandchildren, Aidan, Emma, Liam, Owen, Matt, Lionel, and Jesse Maltby.

Work
Broadway
Ain't Misbehavin', 1978 (Director/Co-lyricist)
Baby, 1983 (Director/Lyricist)
Blood Knot, 1985 (Producer)
Song and Dance, 1986 (Director/Co-lyricist)
Miss Saigon, 1989 (Lyricist)
Nick & Nora, 1991 (Lyricist)
Big, 1996 (Lyricist)
Fosse, 1999 (Director)
Bea Arthur on Broadway, 2002 (Production Consultant)
Ring of Fire, 2006 (Creator/Director)
The Pirate Queen, 2007 (Writer/Lyricist)

Off-Broadway
Closer Than Ever, (1989, two Outer Critics Circle Awards: Best Musical, Best Score) with David Shire
Starting Here, Starting Now, director/lyricist (1977 Grammy nomination) with David Shire
The Story of My Life, 2009 (Director)

Regional
Love Match, lyricist (1968, Ahmanson Theatre, Los Angeles)
The 60's Project, director, (2006, Goodspeed Opera House)
Waterfall, book and lyrics; David Shire music (2015), Pasadena Playhouse
Sousatzka, lyricist (2017), Elgin Theatre, Toronto

Film
Miss Potter, (2007), Screenplay, starring Renée Zellweger and Ewan McGregor (Christopher Award, best screenplay)

Awards and nominations
Awards
1978 Tony Award for Best Direction of a Musical - Ain't Misbehavin
1990 Outer Critics Circle Award for Best Score - Closer Than Ever
1999 Tony Award for Best Direction of a Musical - Fosse
2001 Laurence Olivier Award - Fosse

Nominations
1977 Grammy Award for Best Original Cast Recording - Starting Here, Starting Now
1984 Drama Desk Award for Outstanding Lyrics - Baby
1984 Tony Award for Best Direction of a Musical - Baby
1984 Tony Award for Best Original Score - Baby
1986 Tony Award for Best Direction of a Musical - Song and Dance
1986 Tony Award for Best Musical - Song and Dance
1986 Tony Award for Best Original Score - Song and Dance
1986 Tony Award for Best Play - Blood Knot
1990 Drama Desk Award for Outstanding Lyrics - Closer Than Ever
1991 Tony Award for Best Original Score - Miss Saigon
1992 Tony Award for Best Original Score - Nick & Nora
1996 Drama Desk Award for Outstanding Lyrics - Big
1996 Tony Award for Best Original Score - Big
1999 Drama Desk Award for Outstanding Director of a Musical - Fosse

References

External links
 
 
 Richard Maltby Jr. - Downstage Center interview at American Theatre Wing.org
 MTI Shows biography

1937 births
Living people
American lyricists
American male screenwriters
American theatre directors
American theatre managers and producers
Broadway composers and lyricists
Broadway theatre directors
Harper's Magazine people
People from Ripon, Wisconsin
Puzzle designers
Screenwriters from New York (state)
Screenwriters from Wisconsin
Tony Award winners
Yale University alumni